Methyl 2-chloroacrylate is a colorless liquid used in manufacture of acrylic high polymer similar to polymethylmethacrylate. It is also used as a monomer for certain specialty polymers. 

Methyl 2-chloroacrylate is polymerizable, insoluble in water, and a skin, eye, and lung irritant.  Inhalation of vapors causes pulmonary edema.  Trace amounts on the skin cause large blisters.

2-Aminothiazoline-4-carboxylic acid, an intermediate in the industrial synthesis of L-cysteine, is produced by the reaction of thiourea with methyl 2-chloroacrylate.

References

Monomers
Acrylate esters
Methyl esters